The Kaunia–Dharlla State Railway was a  narrow gauge railway in a part of British India  now in Bangladesh. As a  gauge railway it operated small 0-4-2T and 2-4-0T locomotives

References 

2 ft 6 in gauge railways in Bangladesh
Metre gauge railways in Bangladesh